Jason Cunningham (born 26 September 1989) is a British professional boxer.

Amateur career
Cunningham won the 2011 Amateur Boxing Association British flyweight title, when boxing out of the St Paul's ABC, having been a finalist in 2009 boxing for Doncaster Plant Works ABC.

Professional career
He has held the European super-bantamweight title since May 2021 and previously held the Commonwealth bantamweight title in 2015; the Commonwealth featherweight title in 2017; and challenged once for the British super-flyweight title in 2015.

References

External links

Image - Jason Cunningham

1989 births
English male boxers
Living people
Sportspeople from Doncaster
Bantamweight boxers
Super-flyweight boxers
Flyweight boxers